A kifwebe or bwadi bwa kifwebe is a mask of the Songye or Luba of the Congo.

Uses 
These masks almost always have streaks (incised or painted) on their surface and they are sometimes round shaped (especially among the Luba). They were used in ceremonies of the Kifwebe secret societies where dances of the same name were performed, and the masks were then dressed with beards of long plant fibres attached to holes on the edges of the mask (Figure A). When these beards were absent (lack of fixing holes on the border of the mask) they were called Kabemba (that means "hawks").

Gallery

References

Bibliography 
 Julien Volper, Under the influence of the Songye, Annales des Arts africains, 2012
 Alan P. Merriam, Kifwebe and other masked and unmasked societies among the Basongye, Africa-Tervuren, Tervuren, vol. 24, no 3, 1978
 François Neyt, Kifwebe: Un siècle de masques songye et luba, Cinq continents éditions, 2019

Masks
African art
Masks in Africa